There have been 22 women in the Tasmanian Legislative Council since its establishment in 1825. Women have had the right to vote since 1903 and the right to stand as candidates since 1921.

The first successful female candidate for the Legislative Council was Margaret McIntyre, who was elected as the member for Cornwall in 1948. Like most MLCs, McIntyre was an independent. She died later in 1948 in an air accident, and the next woman elected to the Council was Labor's Lucy Grounds in 1951. Another Labor woman, Phyllis Benjamin, joined Grounds in 1952; Grounds retired in 1958 and Benjamin in 1976, in which year Kath Venn was elected to the Council. After Venn's departure in 1982 there were no women in the Council until 1992, when Jean Moore was elected. She departed in 1994, and since the election of Silvia Smith and Sue Smith to the Council in 1997 women have been represented continuously. In 2009, Vanessa Goodwin became the first Liberal woman elected to the Council.

List of women in the Tasmanian Legislative Council

Names in bold indicate women who have been appointed as Ministers and Parliamentary Secretaries during their time in Parliament. Names in italics indicate entry into Parliament through a by-election or by appointment.

Timeline

See also

 
 
Tasmania